Kalbar (formerly Engelsburg / Engelsberg) is a rural town and locality in the Scenic Rim Region, Queensland, Australia.

Geography

Kalbar is in the Scenic Rim in South East Queensland, 70 km south-west of Central Brisbane. It is located near the Cunningham Highway and directly north of Mount French in the Fassifern Valley.

History
In 1877,  were resumed from the Fassifern pastoral run and offered for selection on 19 April 1877. By 1890 a small town had developed. The town was once known as Fassifern Scrub and then Engelsburg after an early settler, storekeeper August Engels. The town has a very rich German history, having been established "almost exclusively" by German settlers, reflected today in the many Anglo-German road and street names as well as the many local German settler descendant surnames.

Fassifern Scrub Provisional School opened on 3 February 1879. On 4 September 1879 it was renamed Engelsburg State School. Having previously operated in the Baptist Church, the school moved to Edward Street (now Engels Memorial Park) on 28 September 1885. On 24 January 1955, the school relocated to the Kalbar School of Arts while modern school buildings were being constructed in a new site on George Street. On 24 June 1955, the school moved into the new George Street buildings. On 19 April 1958 an official opening of new school site in George Street was held. On 27 August 1979 the school was renamed Kalbar State School (it had not been possible to rename the school during World War I because there was another Kalbar State School in South Kolan which operated until 1962). In 2007 some of the school buildings were invaded by a colony of microbats which lived in the walls and roofs and constituted a health hazard to staff and students as the bats can transmit Australian bat lyssavirus. The staff and students in the affected buildings were relocated into demountable buildings and the bat-infested buildings were demolished. A "bat haven" was established on the school grounds to provide an alternative home for the bat colony (being a protected species). New bat-proof buildings were opened in July 2010.

Engelsburg Post Office opened on 7 July 1897 (a receiving office had been open from 1878. known as Engels for five years) and was renamed Kalbar in 1916.

During the 1899 referendum to decide if Australia should become a federation, Kalbar registered the highest No vote of any town in Queensland.

On Sunday 5 July 1908 the new Engelsburg Primitive Methodist Church was officially opened. It was the Primitive Methodist church building originally built at Dugandan in 1883 and subsequently relocated to Boonah to avoid flooding. Following the opening of a new Methodist Church in Boonah in 1907, the church building was relocated to Engelsburg where it was extensively renovated.

The first stage of the Mount Edwards railway line reached the town on 17 April 1916, with the town being served by the Kalbar railway station at the western end of Railway Street. On 7 October 1922, the second and final stage of the line was completed, including Warumkarie railway station on Warumkarie Road in the south of the Kalbar locality. The Mount Edwards railway line closed in 1960. 

The name changed to Kalbar because of anti-German sentiment in 1916 during World War I. Initially it only applied to the railway station. The Engelsberg School of Arts did not change to the Kalbar School of Arts until July 1918.In 1920, the Kalbar School of Arts hall and half the businesses in town were destroyed by fire.

St Boniface Catholic Church was built in 1888 adjacent to the Catholic cemetery. It closed in 1925. On 20 October 1946, St Boniface Catholic Church was rebuilt on the corner of George and William Streets from the materials taken from the old church. It was dedicated by Monsignor J English and Monsignor M Balwin. It was adjacent to the Catholic cemetery. The church closed in 1978 and in 1987 it was sold to the Assemblies of God (now the Australian Christian Churches). The building is now used by one of its affiliated congregation, the Fassifern Christian Church. 

From 1961 to 1990, Kalbar held a large annual celebration, the Fassifern Potato Festival. The event included a street parade with motorised floats culminating at the show grounds and continuation of festivities. Some artifacts from the festival can be found at the Templin Historical Museum. Harvest Festivals organised by the local Salvation Army church extended back to the 1920s.

The locality contains 453 households, in which 47.8% of the population are males and 52.2% of the population are females with a median age of 41, 3 years above the national average. The average weekly household income is $1,133, $305 below the national average.
4.8% of Kalbar's population is either of Aborigional or Torres Strait Islander descent. 57.3% of the population aged 15 or over is either registered or de facto married, while 42.7% of the population is not married. 28.7% of the population is currently attending some form of a compulsory education. The most common nominated ancestries were Australian (28.6%), English (27.8%) and German (13.4%), while the most common country of birth was Australia (83.0%), and the most commonly spoken language at home was English (90.9%). The most common nominated religions were No religion (23.7%), Catholic (15.0%) and Anglican (14.3%). The most common occupation was a labourer (19.4%) and the majority/plurality of residents worked 40 or more hours per week (40.9%).

Heritage listings

Kalbar has a number of heritage-listed sites, including:
 7 Ann Street: Wiss House
 1008B Boonah-Fassifern Road: Fassifern Homestead
 63 - 65 Edward Street: School of Arts and Memorial Hall
 101 George Street: Wiss Brothers Store
 Teviotville Road: St John’s Lutheran Church

Education 
Kalbar State School is a government primary (Prep-6) school for boys and girls at George Street. In 2017, the school had an enrolment of 202 students with 21 teachers (15 full-time equivalent) and 14 non-teaching staff (8 full-time equivalent). It includes a special education program.

There is no secondary school in Kalbar. The nearest government secondary school is Boonah State High School in Boonah to the south-east.

Amenities 
The Scenic Rim Regional Council operates a mobile library service which visits George Street.

Fassifern Christian Church is on the north-east corner of George Street and William Street. It is affiliated with the Australian Christian Churches.

The Fassifern Corp of the Salvation Army in Australia is at 74 George Street.

Events 
The annual agricultural show is held in June.

Kalbar Country Day is a festival which is held in late October annually since 1991.

Light Up Kalbar is a community street festival held in early December to bring the community together as they light the town's Christmas tree.

References

Further reading

External links

 
 Town map of Kalbar, 1978
 Views of Kalbar, State Library of Queensland

 
Towns in Queensland
1876 establishments in Australia
Populated places established in 1876
Localities in Queensland
Scenic Rim Region